Clive Davis (born 1932) is an American record producer.

Clive Davis may also refer to:

Clive Davis (rugby union) (born 1949), Welsh rugby union footballer
Clive Selwyn Davis (1916–2009), Australian mathematician